The partition type (or partition ID) in a partition's entry in the partition table inside a master boot record (MBR) is a byte value intended to specify the file system the partition contains or to flag special access methods used to access these partitions (e.g. special CHS mappings, LBA access, logical mapped geometries, special driver access, hidden partitions, secured or encrypted file systems, etc.).

Overview 

Lists of assigned partition types to be used in the partition table in the MBR were originally maintained by IBM and Microsoft internally. When the market of PC operating systems and disk tools grew and liberated, other vendors had a need to assign special partition types to their products as well. As Microsoft neither documented all partition types already assigned by them nor wanted to maintain foreign assignments, third parties started to simply assign partition types on their own behalf in a mostly uncoordinated trial-and-error manner. This led to various conflicting assignments sometimes causing severe compatibility problems between certain products.

Several industry experts including Hale Landis, Ralf D. Brown, Matthias R. Paul, and Andries E. Brouwer in the 1990s started to research partition types and published (and later synchronized) partition type lists in order to help document the industry de facto standard and thereby reduce the risk of further conflicts. Some of them also actively helped to maintain software dealing with partitions to work with the updated lists, indicated conflicts, devised additional detection methods and work-arounds for vendors, or engaged in coordinating new non-conflictive partition type assignments as well.

It is up to an operating system's boot loader or kernel how to interpret the value. So the table specifies which operating systems or disk-related products introduced an ID and what file system or special partition type they mapped it to. Partitions with partition types unknown to the software should be treated as reserved but occupied disk storage space which should not be dealt with by the software, save for partition managers.

Local or Experimental Use 

While the list is not officially maintained, new assignments should be coordinated.

In particular temporary partition type assignments for local or experimental projects can utilize type 7Fh in order to avoid conflicts with already assigned types. This type was specially reserved for individual use as part of the Alternative OS Development Partition Standard (AODPS) initiative since 2002.

List of partition IDs 

This is a list of known master boot record partition types on IBM PC compatible computers:

See also 
 
 Extended Boot Record (EBR)
 GUID Partition Table (GPT)
 List of file systems
 Rigid Disk Block (RDB)

Notes

References

Further reading
 (NB. Has partition IDs for the East-German MS-DOS clone DCP 1700 (including R/W and R/O), the CP/M-86 clone SCP 1700, the VENIX clone MUTOS and the iRMX clone BOS1810.)

Disk file systems
Disk partitions
DOS technology
IBM PC compatibles

ca:Partició de disc
pl:Typ partycji